Yongxi may refer to:

Locations
 , Dazu District, China
Yongxi Township, Guizhou (涌溪乡), a township in Zhenyuan County, Guizhou, China
Yongxi Township, Zhejiang (泳溪乡), a township in Tiantai County, Zhejiang, China
Yongxi Subdistrict (雍熙街道), a subdistrict in Nayong County, Guizhou, China
Yongxi, a village in Meichuan, Wuxue, Huanggang, Hubei

Historical eras
 Yongxi (永憙, 144–145), era name used by Emperor Chong of Han
 Yongxi (永熙, 290), era name used by Emperor Hui of Jin
 Yongxi (永熙, 532–535), era name used by Emperor Xiaowu of Northern Wei
 Yongxi (雍熙, 984–987), era name used by Emperor Taizong of Song